This is a list of the National Register of Historic Places listings in Wind Cave National Park.

This is intended to be a complete list of the properties and districts on the National Register of Historic Places in Wind Cave National Park, South Dakota, United States.  The locations of National Register properties and districts for which the latitude and longitude coordinates are included below, may be seen in a Google map.

There are ten properties and districts listed on the National Register in the park.

Current listings 

|--
|}

See also 
 National Register of Historic Places listings in Custer County, South Dakota
 National Register of Historic Places listings in South Dakota

References 
Sources
Karsmizki, Kenneth W.. National Register of Historic Places Multiple Property Documentation Form: Wind Cave National Park Multiple Property Submission. National Park Service 1993 
Notes

Wind Cave National Park